The 2017–18 Liga Nacional de Básquet season is the 34th season of the top professional basketball league in Argentina. The season started on 20 September 2017 with the Torneo Súper 20, which finished on 18 November 2017. The regular season began on 29 November 2017 and finished on 6 May 2018. Starting this season, the competition format underwent significant changes. Instead of two conferences (North and South), all 20 teams are placed in a single group and play a double round-robin, where the best 16 teams at the end of the season qualify for the championship playoffs, while the two teams with the worst record play in a best-of-five relegation series. Before the start of the regular season, the Torneo Súper 20 took place, which awarded two berths to the 2018 Liga Sudamericana de Básquetbol. Salta Basket was relegated after losing the playoff series against Ferro Carril Oeste. San Lorenzo won their third consecutive title, defeating San Martín de Corrientes in the finals.

Relegation and promotion
Torneo Nacional de Ascenso Champions Club Comunicaciones covered the berth left by Atlético Echagüe, who lost the relegation playoffs against Boca Juniors. Libertad conceded their spot due to financial difficulties, and traded places with Salta Basket in the Torneo Nacional de Ascenso,  thus ending a streak of 19 seasons in the top flight of Argentine basketball.

Clubs

Torneo Súper 20
The inaugural edition of the pre-season tournament Torneo Súper 20 took place between 20 September and 18 November 2017. Four groups of five teams each were formed, and played a double round-robin. The top three teams from each group advanced to the playoff stage directly, while the fourth and fifth teams of each group were paired in four best-of-three series to grant the four remaining berths for the playoff stage. The playoff stage consisted of best-of-three series up to the semifinals, where a final four, single-elimination match format was used.  The two teams that reached the final were granted a berth in the 2018 Liga Sudamericana de Básquetbol.

First stage

Group A

Group B

Group C

Group D

Playoffs

Regular season

League table

Playoffs
Playoffs began on 6 May. The relegation series between Ferro Carril Oeste and Salta Basket is set to begin on 9 May.

Championship playoffs

Relegation playoffs

Clubs in international competitions

Awards
The regular season awards were presented on 10 May.

Yearly Awards
Most Valuable Player: Gabriel Deck, San Lorenzo
Best Argentine Player: Gabriel Deck, San Lorenzo
Best Foreign Player:  Donald Sims, Atenas
Sixth Man of the Year: Justin Keenan, San Martín de Corrientes
Rookie of the Year: Fernando Zurbriggen, Obras Sanitarias
Most Improved Player: Jonathan Maldonado, La Unión
Coach of the Year: Sebastián González, San Martín de Corrientes
All-Tournament Team:
 F Marcos Mata, San Lorenzo
 F Gabriel Deck, San Lorenzo
 C Jerome Meyinsse, Atenas
 G Dwayne Davis, Instituto (Córdoba)
 G Donald Sims, Atenas

References

Liga Nacional de Básquet seasons
   
Argentina